HC Bat Yam is an Israeli ice hockey team based in Bat Yam that competes in the Israeli League. HC Bat Yam was founded in 1992 and won their first league title in 1995. In 2010, the club qualified for their first IIHF Continental Cup, however they were knocked out in the first round without winning a game. HC Bat Yam won their second title in 2016 and as a result qualified for the 2016–17 IIHF Continental Cup.

History
HC Bat Yam was founded in 1992 in Bat Yam, Israel and joined the Israeli League. In the 1993–94 season, Bat Yam finished as runner-up to HC Haifa. Bat Yam improved in the 1994–95 season with the club finishing the regular season in first place after winning seven of their eight games to claim their first regular season title. In the playoffs Bat Yam was drawn against the fourth place HC Metulla for their semifinal. Bat Yam defeated Metulla 13–5 to advance to final against the Jerusalem Capitals who had defeated HC Haifa in the other semifinal. Bat Yam defeated the Jerusalem Capitals 11–3 to claim their first league title. The following season Bat Yam finished in second place behind the Lions Jerusalem. From the 1997–98 season to the 1999–2000 season, Bat Yam finished the regular season in fourth place and were eliminated from the playoffs in the semifinals. The following season, Bat Yam dropped out of playoff contention after finishing the regular season in fifth place. In the 2009–10 season, Bat Yam returned to the playoffs and qualified for the final against HC Ma’alot where they were defeated. The club however qualified for the 2010–11 IIHF Continental Cup where they entered in the first round. Bat Yam lost both of their games against CH Jaca and Ankara University SK and failed to qualify for the second round. The club again finished as runners-up in the 2011–12 season after being defeated by Maccabi Metulla. In 2012, the team's current arena, Ice Peaks Holon, was opened in the city of Holon. The following three seasons Bat Yam failed to qualify for the playoffs. In the 2015–16 season, Bat Yam finished the regular season in fourth placed and were drawn against the regular season winner, Horses Kfar Saba for the semifinal. Bat Yam defeated Horses Kfar Saba 7–2 and advanced to the final against Monfort Ma'alot who had defeated the Rishon Devils in the other semifinal. Bat Yam defeated Monfort Maalot 6–3 in the final to claim their second league title. As a result of winning the 2016 final Bat Yam also qualified for the 2016–17 IIHF Continental Cup where they entered in the first round. The club was placed in Group A alongside Irbis-Skate Sofia, Partizan Belgrade and Zeytinburnu Belediyespor.

Season by season results

2010-2015
 The table shows the results of the regular season and the final stage.
 RS — The place occupied by the team is shown according to the results of the regular season.
 FS — The place occupied by the team is shown according to the results of the final stage.

2016 — 2018

2019

Tournaments
2010–11 IIHF Continental Cup – 3rd in Group A of the First Round. Failed to advance.
2016–17 IIHF Continental Cup – 4th in Group A of the First Round. Failed to advance.

Players and personnel

Current roster
 True on 15 September 2019

Team roster for the 2017–18 season

Head coaches
Yevgeni Gusin, 2006–2012
Dmitri Gromkov, 2012–present

General managers
Viktor Gokhberg, 2015–present

Achievements 

 Israel
Israeli League:
  Winners (4) : 1994–95, 2015–16, 2017–18, 2018-19

References

External links
HC Bat Yam Facebook

1992 establishments in Israel
Ice hockey clubs established in 1992
Ice hockey teams in Israel